Denham Jephson may refer to:

Denham Jephson (died 1781) (c. 1721–1781), MP for Mallow
Denham Jephson (died 1813) (c. 1748–1813), MP for Mallow

See also
Denham Jephson-Norreys (1799–1888), MP for Mallow